Conagra Brands, Inc. (formerly ConAgra Foods) is an American consumer packaged goods holding company headquartered in Chicago, Illinois. Conagra makes and sells products under various brand names that are available in supermarkets, restaurants, and food service establishments. Based on its 2021 revenue, the company ranked 331st on the 2022 Fortune 500.

History

Founding and success 
ConAgra was founded in 1919 by Frank Little and Alva Kinney, who brought together four grain mills as Nebraska Consolidated Mills (NCM) at Grand Island, Nebraska. The headquarters were moved to Omaha in 1922. The company ran at a profit until 1936, when Kinney retired. In 1940, the company began producing flour at its own mill, and in 1942 ventured into the livestock feed business. That year, NCM president R. S. Dickinson opened the company's first out-of-state facility in Alabama with a flour mill and animal feed plant.

After researching new uses for its flour, NCM funded the establishment of the Duncan Hines brand of cake mixes in 1951 as a way to market more flour. This venture was very successful, leading the company to its current place as the third largest flour miller in the U.S. However, this did not lead NCM to consider other food ventures, and instead it sold its Duncan Hines assets to Procter & Gamble in 1956. As American households purchased more and more prepared and instant foods in the 1950s and 1960s, NCM chose not to expand into the businesses that used its flour, instead turning in the opposite direction and focusing more on raw foods like poultry and expanding its livestock feed business.

Decline and comeback 
In 1971, Nebraska Consolidated Mills changed its name to "ConAgra Foods", with "ConAgra" being a portmanteau of "consolidated" and "agriculture." The 1970s brought the company to the brink of ruin, as the company lost money attempting to expand into the fertilizer, catfish, and pet product industries, and as commodity speculation wiped out ConAgra's margins on raw foods. In 1974, C. Michael "Mike" Harper, an experienced food industry executive, took over the firm and brought it back from the brink of bankruptcy. Nonetheless, ConAgra's business model left it vulnerable to volatile commodity prices.

In response, the company set off on a two-decade-long buying spree, purchasing over one hundred prepared food brands, starting with its 1980 purchase of Banquet Foods. It moved heavily into the frozen food business and the packaged meat industry, and then picked up a selection of other brands from firms like RJR Nabisco and Beatrice Foods (including Hunt-Wesson and Swift-Eckrich) among others, as the leveraged buyouts of the 1980s resulted in the divestiture or breakup of many major American consumer product firms. In 1993 alone it purchased $500 million in smaller firms, and in 1998 it purchased another $480 million in brands from Nabisco.

Modification of business areas and further acquisitions 
In 2002, ConAgra Foods sold its fresh meat operations under the name Swift & Company to Hicks, Muse, Tate & Furst, Inc. and Booth Creek Management.

In 2006, ConAgra Foods sold its Chicago-area-based refrigerated meats business (Butterball, Eckrich, Armour) to Smithfield Foods. ConAgra maintained a presence in Chicago by moving its Hunt-Wesson business there from California.

In 2007, ConAgra acquired Watts Brothers Farms, a vegetable processing and agricultural operation, including an organic dairy.

On November 27, 2012, ConAgra officials announced the company was purchasing Ralcorp, pending Ralcorp shareholder approval, for approximately $4.95 billion. Stockholders of Ralcorp Holdings, Inc. would receive $90 per share. The deal completed in January 2013 and made ConAgra the largest private-label packaged food business in the United States.

Exit from Nebraska and rebranding 
On October 1, 2015, ConAgra announced that it would cut about 1,500 jobs and relocate its headquarters to Chicago as part of a restructuring plan. The move of headquarters from Omaha to Chicago was completed in late June 2016 with the opening of their new HQ at the Merchandise Mart building. It is the first time since 1922 that ConAgra has not been headquartered in Omaha and the first time in the company's history, dating back to its 1919 founding, that the headquarters will not be in the state of Nebraska.

On July 14, 2014, ConAgra announced that it had acquired TaiMei Potato Industry Limited, a potato processor in Shangdu, Inner Mongolia. This acquisition expands ConAgra Foods' Lamb Weston operations in a market that has growing demand for frozen potato products.

On November 18, 2015, ConAgra announced it was spinning off its Lamb Weston division into a separate company that would be based in Kennewick, Washington. They also announced that ConAgra Foods would be renamed as Conagra Brands in 2016. Thomas Werner and Timothy McLevish were named executive and executive chairman. The Lamb Weston spinoff was completed on November 9, 2016, with the new company headquartered in the suburbs of Boise, Idaho, with major manufacturing facilities in Oregon and Washington. At the same time, ConAgra Foods changed their name to Conagra Brands (now with a lowercase A), complete with a new logo.

Recent history 
On September 22, 2017, Conagra announced that it was acquiring Angie's Artisan Treats, maker of Angie's Boomchickapop popcorn. The acquisition was completed on October 23, 2017.

On June 27, 2018, Conagra Brands announced the acquisition of Pinnacle Foods for $8.1 billion. The acquisition closed on October 26, 2018.

On December 8, 2020, Conagra announced that it was selling the Peter Pan brand to Post Holdings. The transaction was completed on January 25, 2021.

Governance 
The board of directors are: Mogens C. Bay, Stephen G. Butler, Steven F. Goldstone, Joie A. Gregor, Rajive Johri, W. G. Jurgensen, Richard H. Lenny, Ruth Ann Marshall, Gary M. Rodkin, Andrew J. Schindler, and Kenneth E. Stinson.

Products 

Conagra produces a wide array of food products including cooking oil, frozen dinners, hot cocoa, hot dogs, peanut butter and many others. Some of ConAgra's major brands include Act II, Hunt's, Healthy Choice, Marie Callender's, Udi's Gluten-Free, Orville Redenbacher's, Slim Jim, Reddi-wip, Egg Beaters, Pam, Angie's Boom Chicka Pop, Earth Balance, Glutino, Hebrew National, Duke's, Chef Boyardee, Home Menu and Bertolli ready meals.

Partnership with Feeding America against child hunger 
The nonprofit ConAgra Foods Foundation has pledged a five-year commitment of $10 million to Feeding America to fight child hunger. Additionally, ConAgra Foods founded the Child Hunger Ends Here campaign in 2013 that would donate up to 3 million meals equivalent to Feeding America by donating one meal for each code submitted to the campaign's website by consumers.

Criticism

Environmental issues 
Conagra has been criticized for its lack of response to global climate change. A 2006 report by Ceres, a non-profit organization that works to address global climate change and other sustainability issues, entitled "Corporate Governance and Climate Change: Making the Connection", measures how 100 leading global companies are responding to global warming. Companies in the report were evaluated on a 0 to 100 scale. ConAgra scored a total of 4 points, the lowest of any of the food companies rated. In a 2009 ranking by Newsweek, ConAgra ranked 342nd out of U.S. 500 largest corporations in terms of overall environmental score.

In 2003–2004, ConAgra participated in a Minnesota Pollution Control Agency voluntary investigation and clean-up program. Through the program, the company cleaned up a property previously used for lithium ore processing and constructed a new  office/warehouse building. This voluntary program offers "future liability protection".

On January 7, 2014, a California Superior Court found that ConAgra and its co-defendants were liable in creating a public nuisance due to lead-based paint the companies sold.  Ten local governments in California filed the suit and the court ordered Conagra, NL Industries and Sherwin-Williams to pay $1.15 billion to remove or abate the lead in homes located in those cities and counties.  Although ConAgra never produced paint, it assumed the liabilities of W. P. Fuller & Co., a San Francisco-based paint producer, through a series of acquisitions. The disposition of The People v. ConAgra Grocery Products Company et al. in the California sixth Appellate District Court on November 14, 2017, is that

Labor issues 
In May 2003, ConAgra and its subsidiary Gilroy Foods agreed to pay $1.5 million to settle charges of hiring discrimination brought by the Equal Employment Opportunity Commission (EEOC). The charges involved a July 1999 Teamsters strike at a plant in King City, California, then owned by Basic Vegetable Products LP but later purchased by ConAgra. In August 2001, the company negotiated with the union an end to the two-year strike with a new contract that would recall workers based on seniority. However, the recall process excluded workers who were on leave at the time of the purchase including those out due to work injury or pregnancy. Others were denied jobs due to a history of previous injury or illness, despite their having no restrictions on returning to work. According to the EEOC, most of the 39 workers who were excluded from the recall process had been working at the plant for 10 to 30 years and were primarily Hispanic and female.

The company's Greeley, Colorado, plant had been cited almost 10 times from 1999 to 2002 for violating worker safety.

In July 2004, six people were killed in a shooting inside the ConAgra Foods plant in Kansas City, Kansas.

Fraud and bribery 
In 1997, ConAgra pleaded guilty to federal criminal charges that its Peavey Grain unit illegally sprayed water on stored grain to increase its weight and value and also bribed federal inspectors. The company agreed to pay $8.3 million to resolve the charges, which included a $4.4 million criminal fine, $3.45 million as compensation for illegal profits and $450,000 to reimburse the U.S. Department of Agriculture for storage and investigation expenses. Conagra had also paid $2 million to settle a related civil case filed by a group of Indiana farmers.

Multinational Monitor, a corporate watchdog organization, named Conagra one of the 'Top 100 Corporate Criminals of the 1990s'.

Demolition of historic site 
In 1988, ConAgra threatened to relocate from Omaha to Denver, Chicago or Minneapolis if the city didn't help find a new location for its headquarters. Charles Harper, the chief executive of Conagra at the time, requested that the city of Omaha demolish a historic site, one of the largest on the National Register of Historic Places.  Omaha approved the demolition of over 20 historic structures in Jobbers Canyon Historic District, a 19th-century warehouse district along the banks of the Missouri River in Downtown Omaha, Nebraska.  The demolition made room for a sprawling new corporate campus and headquarters, and prompted protests and lawsuits from historic preservationists. Harper had described the structures as "some big, ugly red brick buildings."

The National Trust for Historic Preservation asked that the historic legacy of a city and region not be held hostage to the narrow corporate preferences of a single commercial enterprise, but Conagra refused to reconsider. The Jobbers Canyon district was adjacent to another historic district, the Old Market, which has proved to be an important center of cultural, tourist, and residential development in Omaha. Omaha's then-planning director, Marty Shukert, said it was more important to keep the city's downtown core healthy than to keep the historic district.

Others noted that the district was in disrepair and ConAgra's new headquarters have been an aesthetic and economic improvement for the city. In 2015, Conagra announced the relocation of its headquarters to the 100 year old historic Merchandise Market, in Chicago, in spite of the demolition of Jobbers Canyon.

Accounting issues 
On May 23, 2001, ConAgra Foods, Inc., announced that it would restate its earnings for 1998, 1999 and 2000, due to accounting and conduct matters at its United Agri Products Cos. unit. For fiscal 1998, revenues was cut from $24.27 billion to $24.19 billion.

On March 24, 2005, ConAgra Foods, Inc. announced that the results for fiscal 2003 and 2004 would be restated to reflect a reduction in after-tax profits of $150 million to $200 million in total.

Genetically modified food 
In 2002, Conagra and other major food and beverage companies including PepsiCo, General Mills, Kelloggs, Sara Lee, and H. J. Heinz Co. spent millions to defeat Oregon Ballot Measure 27, which would have required food companies to label products that contain genetically modified ingredients. According to the Oregon Secretary of State, ConAgra contributed $71,000 to the campaign to defeat the state ballot initiative.

Throughout 2012, ConAgra contributed $1,176,700 to a $46 million political campaign known as the Coalition Against the Costly Food Labeling Proposition, sponsored by food producers. The organization's goal was to oppose the California citizen's initiative, known as Proposition 37, demanding mandatory labeling of foods containing genetically modified ingredients.

Although the proposition was defeated, there was strong consumer backlash against the coalition's opposition. Consumer advocates encouraged nationwide boycotts of coalition members, and movements were started in several other states to enact similar labeling requirements. As a result, ConAgra and others in the Coalition met with Walmart (the largest food retailer in the U.S.) to seek a nationwide labeling system for genetically modified foods, instead of trying to defeat the measures in every state.

Product incidents

2002 E. coli outbreak 
Conagra recalled 19 million pounds of ground beef in July 2002 with E. coli bacterial contamination. It was the third-largest recall up to that time. That meat was linked to the illnesses of 19 people in six Western and Midwestern states.

2006–2007 Salmonella outbreak 
In February 2007, Conagra recalled jars of Peter Pan and Great Value brand peanut butter with the product code "2111" on the lid, because they were linked to a Salmonella outbreak. Ultimately, the Centers for Disease Control and Prevention (CDC) documented more than 628 individuals who were stricken with Salmonella poisoning in 47 states that could be traced back to Peter Pan and Great Value peanut butter. Of those, 20% were hospitalized, according to the CDC, which reported no deaths associated with the outbreak.

Since Peter Pan (but not Great Value) is only made at one plant, the recall included all Peter Pan jars sold in the U.S. between May 2006 and February 2007. In May 2015, the company agreed to plead guilty to releasing products tainted with Salmonella into interstate commerce. Sentencing was delayed by U.S. District Court Judge W. Louis Sands, who ordered nationwide newspaper advertisements searching for victims of the outbreak so the government could supply Victim Impact Statements for inclusion in the pre-sentence report.

Diacetyl 
On September 4, 2007, the Flavor and Extract Manufacturers Association recommended reduction of diacetyl in butter-like flavorings, such as those used in popcorn, due to cases of the potentially fatal disease bronchiolitis obliterans or "Popcorn Workers's Lung" appearing among plant workers exposed to diacetyl fumes, as well as in one case that involved a popcorn consumer. The next day ConAgra Foods announced that it would soon remove diacetyl from its Jiffy Pop and Orville Redenbacher's popcorn products.

2007 Salmonella outbreak 
On October 11, 2007, Conagra asked stores to pull the Banquet and generic brand chicken and turkey pot pies due to 152 cases of Salmonella poisoning in 31 states being linked to the consumption of Conagra pot pies, with 20 people hospitalized. At that time, both the USDA and Conagra decided in favor of a consumer advisory and against a recall. ConAgra said the issue stemmed from pies not being cooked thoroughly in older microwaves, and that the package's heating instructions would be changed to reflect different microwaves. However, the plant in Marshall, Missouri, where the pot pies were manufactured closed on October 11 as well.

By October 12, a full recall was announced, affecting all varieties of frozen pot pies sold under the brands Banquet, Albertson's, Food Lion, Great Value, Hill Country Fare, Kirkwood, Kroger, Meijer, and Western Family. The recalled pot pies included all varieties in 7-oz. single-serving packages bearing the number P-9 or "Est. 1059" printed on the side of the package. By October 14, 174 cases of Salmonella poisoning in 32 states were linked to consumption of the contaminated ConAgra pot pies, with 33 people hospitalized. Public interest groups criticized Conagra for the delay in issuing the recall, a decision which Conagra defended by saying the recall was a precaution. At the time of the recall, the USDA had still not identified the source of the Salmonella contamination.

On October 17, the Colorado Department of Public Health reported that "An investigation by the Centers for Disease Control and Prevention and state public health departments involved a large cluster of illnesses caused by Salmonella that identified these products" and stated that, "Nationally, at least 211 individuals from 35 states have become ill."  From January 1 through December 31, 2007, the CDC identified a total of 401 cases in 41 states.

2009 Slim Jim plant explosion 

On June 9, 2009, at 11:27 am ET, an explosion rocked the Slim Jim manufacturing plant in Garner, North Carolina resulting in the collapse of a section of the facility's roof and wall. Three workers were killed, a fourth died from burn injuries five months later, while 67 others – including three firefighters – were hospitalized for burns and exposure to ammonia gases. The explosion happened when natural gas was purged into the interior of the building during commissioning of a new, gas-fired water heater. This explosion was directly responsible for an amendment to the National Fuel Gas Code prohibiting fuel gas piping systems in large buildings from being purged indoors.

On March 3, 2010, ConAgra announced that the Garner plant would close in approximately 18 months, and Slim Jim production would be moved to a plant located in Troy, Ohio.

See also 
 Impact of the COVID-19 pandemic on the meat industry in the United States

References

External links 

 

Companies listed on the New York Stock Exchange
Food and drink companies established in 1919
1919 establishments in Nebraska
 
Food recalls
Food manufacturers of the United States
Condiment companies of the United States
Multinational food companies